Henryville is a census-designated place (CDP) in Monroe Township, Clark County, in the U.S. state of Indiana. The population was 1,905 at the 2010 census.

Henryville is home to Indiana's oldest state forest, Clark State Forest, and birthplace of entrepreneur Colonel Harland Sanders, whose iconic image appears in the Kentucky Fried Chicken logo and Grammy award-winning bluegrass fiddle player Michael Cleveland.

History
In 1850, the village of Morristown was established. It was renamed Henryville in 1853 to honor Colonel Henry Ferguson, who was once a colonel in the Pennsylvania militia. He purchased the land on which Henryville was established, and helped persuade Pennsylvania Railroad officials to run the line through Clark County. The Henryville post office was established in 1865.

Henryville is the birthplace of "Colonel" Harland Sanders, founder of Kentucky Fried Chicken.

2012 tornado

At approximately 3:15 p.m. (EST) on March 2, 2012, an EF4 tornado caused extensive damage to Henryville, killing one person. It was on the ground for more than 50 miles.  The storm destroyed Henryville Elementary School and Henryville Jr/Sr High School.

Geography
Henryville is located at  (38.541088, -85.766677).

Climate
The climate in this area is characterized by hot, humid summers and generally mild to cool winters.  According to the Köppen Climate Classification system, Henryville has a humid subtropical climate, abbreviated "Cfa" on climate maps.

Demographics

As of the census of 2000, there were 1,545 people, 583 households, and 434 families residing in the CDP. The racial makeup of the CDP was 99.16% White, 0.06% African American, 0.13% Native American, 0.26% Asian, and 0.39% from two or more races. Hispanic or Latino of any race were 0.26% of the population.

There were 583 households, out of which 38.1% had children under the age of 18 living with them, 58.8% were married couples living together, 11.0% had a female householder with no husband present, and 25.4% were non-families. 21.6% of all households were made up of individuals, and 7.9% had someone living alone who was 65 years of age or older. The average household size was 2.65 and the average family size was 3.07.

In the CDP, the population was spread out, with 26.1% under the age of 18, 10.4% from 18 to 24, 32.6% from 25 to 44, 22.1% from 45 to 64, and 8.7% who were 65 years of age or older. The median age was 34 years. For every 100 females, there were 97.1 males. For every 100 females age 18 and over, there were 96.4 males.

The median income for a household in the CDP was $49,405, and the median income for a family was $55,000. Males had a median income of $38,938 versus $22,043 for females. The per capita income for the CDP was $17,745. About 6.2% of families and 4.9% of the population were below the poverty line, including none of those under age 18 and 27.0% of those age 65 or over.

Education

Henryville has an elementary, and junior/senior high school.

Henryville has a public library, a branch of the Charlestown-Clark County Public Library.

Infrastructure

Highway
Interstate 65 passes north-south through the west side of Henryville and roughly parallels the older U.S. Route 31. Indiana State Road 160 intersects the previous two roads in Henryville.

Rail
The Louisville & Indiana Railroad runs north-south through Henryville and roughly parallels U.S. Route 31.

References

External links

Borden-Henryville School Corporation
Clark State Forestry

Census-designated places in Clark County, Indiana
Census-designated places in Indiana
Populated places established in 1850
1850 establishments in Indiana
Louisville metropolitan area